Keçiören is a metropolitan district of Ankara Province in the Central Anatolia region of Turkey, a crowded district in the northern part of the city of Ankara. The Çubuk River runs through the middle of the district.

Demographics 

2021   942,884

Neighbourhoods 
There are 50 neighbourhoods in Keçiören as of 2017.

Etymology
The name Keçiören comes from "keçi" (goat) and "ören" (ruins). Ankara is famous for its goat (Ankara Keçisi), which is used as a source of Angora clothings such as Angora sweatshirts. The area was used for stock breeding long before it became a suburban area.

Politics
Until the 1950s this was a green and pleasant area outside the city, but in recent years has become a large district of housing for Ankara's working class. The President of Turkey Recep Tayyip Erdoğan has his Ankara residence within the district.  The area is also a well known location for far right nationalists.

In August 2018, the Municipality decided not to issue business licenses to American brands including McDonald's, Starbucks and Burger King as a response to the U.S. sanctions on Turkey.

Sports
The sports club Keçiörengücü is based in Keçiören.

Prominent neighbourhoods
 Etlik, located on high ground, overlooking the city
 İncirli

Places of interest
Mustafa Kemal Atatürk's headquarters during the Turkish War of Independence, today used by the department of meteorology

The current administration has made efforts to decorate the mass of dull concrete that the area mainly consists of. The new buildings include a huge artificial waterfall and many other pools and fountains, and a concrete replica of the Hungarian Esztergom Castle.

Gondola lift
Keçiören has a two-station aerial lift, the Keçiören Gondola, which connects the neighborhoods Tepebaşı (Cumhuriyet station) and Kavacık Subayevleri (Atatürk station).

Famous locals 
 Selahattin Bıyıklı, kick-box champion

Keçiören children's games
To many Turkish people the name Keçiören evokes a popular children's TV outdoor game show (similar to the British It's a Knockout) of the 1980s, which was recorded in the district.

Twin towns – sister cities
The following places are sister cities to Keçiören:
 Tainan, Taiwan (2005)
 Goražde, Bosnia and Herzegovina (2010)
 Stirling, Scotland (2013)

Mayors of Goverment Keçiören Muncipality 

 1984-1989 Melih Gökçek ANAP
 1989-1989 Hamza Kırmızı SHP
 1994-1999 Turgut Altınok MHP
 1999-2001 Turgut Altınok Fazilet Party
 2001-2009 Turgut Altınok AK Party
 2009-2019 Mustafa Ak AK Party
 2019-present Turgut Altınok AK Party

Notes

References

External links
 District State Website 
 District governor's official website 
 District municipality's official website 
 District Service Website 

 
Populated places in Ankara Province
Districts of Ankara Province